"Oh My" is a song by English singer Dappy. The song features Ay Em. Polydor Records released it on 17 May 2018 as a single.

Music video 
The song was supported by a music video.

Charts

Certifications

References

2018 singles
2018 songs
Dappy songs